Adra Junction railway station serves Adra town, and also serves the industrial towns of Raghunathpur and Kashipur in Purulia district in the Indian state of West Bengal. It is a gateway to the famous tourist spots of Purulia district. It also servers as the divisional headquarters of the Adra Division of the South Eastern Railway zone of Indian Railways.

It is an important junction station, with railway tracks from four different directions meeting there and is the busiest station in the entire division handling a huge amount of passenger and freight train traffic in a day.

Trains
Some of the Major Trains available from this railway station are as follows:
 New Delhi Bhubaneswar Rajdhani Express
 Bhubaneswar–New Delhi Duronto Express
 Yesvantpur–Kamakhya AC Superfast Express
 MGR Chennai Central–New Jalpaiguri Superfast Express
 Purulia–Villupuram Superfast Express
 Mumbai Lokmanya Tilak-Howrah Samarsata Express
 Porbandar–Santragachi Kavi Guru Express
 Puri Baidyanath Dham Express
 Puri–Jaynagar Express
 Puri–Kamakhya Express
 Puri-Anand Vihar Nandan Kanan Express
 Howrah–Purulia Express
 Digha–Malda Town Express
 Haldia–Asansol Express
 Digha–Asansol Express
 Howrah–Ranchi Intercity Express
 Santragachi-Parulia Rupasi Bangla Express
 Ernakulam-Patna Express
 Kolkata Shalimar- Bhojudih Aranyak Express

History
The Howrah–Allahabad–Mumbai line, a joint effort of Great Indian Peninsula Railway and East Indian Railway Company came up in 1870. However, it was only after Kharagpur was linked from the west and the south that it was connected to Howrah in 1900.

BNR lines were extended to Gomoh, on EIR's main line, in 1907. The Mohuda–Chandrapura branch line was opened in 1913.

Electrification
The Asansol–Purulia section was electrified in 1961–62.
The first MEMU train services in SER were started in between Adra and Asansol. Later these services started between Adra–Purulia, Adra–Tatanagar and Adra–Medinipur.

Gallery

References

External links
 Trains at Adra

Railway stations in Purulia district
Adra railway division
Railway stations in India opened in 1891